The Roman Catholic Diocese of Mexicali (erected 25 March 1966) is a suffragan diocese of the Archdiocese of Tijuana. It was a suffragan of the Archdiocese of Hermosillo until 25 November 2006.

Bishops

Ordinaries
Manuel Pérez-Gil y González (1966 - 1984), appointed Bishop of Tlalnepantla, México
José Ulises Macías Salcedo (1984 - 1996), appointed Archbishop of Hermosillo, Sonora
José Isidro Guerrero Macías (1997 - 2022)

Other priests of this diocese who became bishops
Jesús José Herrera Quiñonez, appointed Bishop of Nuevo Casas Grandes, Chihuahua in 2011
José Fortunato Álvarez Valdéz, appointed Bishop of Gómez Palacio, Durango in 2015

Territorial losses

Episcopal See
Mexicali, Baja California

External links and references

Mexicali
Mexicali
Mexicali, Roman Catholic Diocese of
Mexicali
Mexicali